Claudia Moscovici (born June 12, 1969) is a Romanian-American novelist and art/literary critic.

Life 

Moscovici was born in Bucharest, Romania. At the age of 12, she immigrated with her family to the  United States where she has gone on to obtain a B.A. from Princeton University and a Ph.D. in Comparative Literature from Brown University. Moscovici taught philosophy, literature and arts and ideas at Boston University and at the University of Michigan. Born in Bucharest, Romania, she writes from her experience of life in a totalitarian regime, which marked her deeply.

Works 
Claudia Moscovici is the author of Velvet Totalitarianism (Rowman and Littlefield Publishing, 2009) a novel about a Romanian family's survival in an oppressive communist regime due to the strength of their love. This novel was republished in translation in her native country, Romania, under the title Intre Doua Lumi (Curtea Veche Publishing, 2011).

In 2002, she co-founded with Mexican sculptor Leonardo Pereznieto the international aesthetic movement called “Postromanticism”,  devoted to celebrating beauty, passion and sensuality in contemporary art. She wrote a book on Romanticism and its postromantic survival called Romanticism and Postromanticism, (Lexington Books, 2007) and taught philosophy, literature and arts and ideas at Boston University and at the University of Michigan. Most recently, she published a nonfiction book on psychopathic seduction, called Dangerous Liaisons (Hamilton Books, 2011) and a psychological thriller called The Seducer (forthcoming in March, 2012), which tells the story of a woman lured by a dangerous psychopathic predator.

Books 

This Claudia Moscovici bibliography is a partial list of books written by Romanian-American writer Claudia Moscovici.

Notes

References 
http://www.curteaveche.wordpress.com/2011/09/20/intre-doua-lumi/Noualiteratura.files.wordpress.com/2010/01/nl-29.pdf
http://Geopolitikon.files.wordpress.com/2010/04/scrisulromanesc_3_2010.pdf
http://www.postromanticism.com/philosophy/main_philo.html
 De la "Efectul Coandă" la "Efectul Glenn", 6 iunie 2012, Tudor Cires, Jurnalul Național
http://www.catchy.ro/aventurile-unei-postromantice-intr-o-epoca-postcomunista-interviu/17711
https://web.archive.org/web/20120426042022/http://www.forbes.ro/Cum-sa-promovezi-cu-metode-americane-o-carte-despre-comunism_0_2301.html
http://www.revistavip.net/Stiri_de_ultima_ora/Dezvaluirile_scriitoarei_romance_Claudia_Moscovici_/6155/Claudia
https://web.archive.org/web/20111206183551/http://www.curteaveche.ro/Intre_doua_lumi-3-1298
http://m.rfi.ro/articol/asculta-rfi-ro/doua-lumi
 Între două lumi, 16 septembrie 2011, Claudia Moscovici, Ziarul de Duminică
 Andy Platon a realizat primul music-video făcut pentru o carte, 25 septembrie 2011, Libertatea

External links
 
 at  Official Site of Postromanticism
 Observations and Research at Literary Kicks
 alleged feedback from pupils 
 GENERAȚIA X | Claudia Moscovici, scriitoare de succes în Statele Unite, 21 aprilie 2015, Digi24.ro

Living people
Romanian novelists
Boston University faculty
1969 births
American women writers
Romanian women novelists
Romanian emigrants to the United States
Writers from Bucharest
University of Michigan faculty
American women academics
21st-century American women